The 1999 IBF World Championships (World Badminton Championships) were held in Copenhagen, Denmark, between 10 May and 23 May 1999. Following the results of the women's singles.

Main stage

Section 1

Section 2

Section 3

Section 4

Final stage

External links 
 http://www.tournamentsoftware.com/sport/events.aspx?id=0C8BEFBC-C502-47FB-8C0B-A57F034F3452
 http://www.worldbadminton.com/results/19990518_WorldChampionships/results.htm

1999 IBF World Championships
IBF